Major-General George Neville Wood  (4 May 1898 – 1982) was a senior British Army officer who fought during the First and Second World War, commanding the 25th Indian Infantry Division during the Burma campaign.

Early life
Wood was born on 4 May 1898 in Bristol, England the son of Frederick and Hannah Wood, his father was a commercial traveller.

Military career
After being educated at Colston's School, Wood entered the Royal Military College, Sandhurst and was commissioned as a second lieutenant into the Dorsetshire Regiment in 1916. He fought in the First World War, serving the last year of the war in the Royal Air Force and was awarded the Military Cross, mentioned in despatches and made an Officer of the Order of the British Empire. He went on to serve in the Russian Civil War.

He was promoted to temporary major in 1920.

Attending the Staff College, Camberley from 1926 to 1927, during the Second World War Wood was the Commanding Officer (CO) of the 12th Battalion, West Yorkshire Regiment in 1941 and CO of the 2nd Battalion, Dorset Regiment between late 1941 and mid-1942. In July 1942 he was the acting commander of the 5th Indian Infantry Brigade before becoming commander of the 4th Indian Infantry Brigade until January 1943. In October 1944, Wood was made acting major-general and took the command of the 25th Indian Infantry Division, overseeing victory at the decisive Battle of Kangaw and Operation Zipper during the Burma campaign.

Promoted to full major-general in February 1947, Wood became General Officer Commanding (GOC) 3rd (United Kingdom) Division in April 1947;  between August 1947 and March 1950, he was GOC 53rd (Welsh) Infantry Division, before serving as Director of Quartering at the War Office until his retirement in 1952. He was subsequently honorary colonel of the Dorset Regiment from 1952 to 1958 and the first honorary colonel of the Devonshire and Dorset Regiment.

References

Bibliography

External links
Generals of World War II

|-

|-

|-

|-

1898 births
1982 deaths
British Army major generals
People educated at Colston's School
Royal Air Force personnel of World War I
British Army personnel of the Russian Civil War
Dorset Regiment officers
British Army personnel of World War I
Companions of the Order of the Bath
Companions of the Distinguished Service Order
Recipients of the Military Cross
British Army generals of World War II
Graduates of the Staff College, Camberley
Graduates of the Royal Military College, Sandhurst
Military personnel from Bristol